Hypatopa dicax is a moth in the family Blastobasidae. It is found in Costa Rica.

The length of the forewings is about 8.1 mm. The forewings are pale brown intermixed with a few brown scales. The hindwings are translucent pale brown.

Etymology
The specific name is derived from Latin dicax (meaning ready of speech or witty).

References

Moths described in 2013
Hypatopa